Rulindo is a district (akarere) in Northern Province, Rwanda. Its capital is Tare (also known as Bushoki).

Geography 
The district lies roughly halfway between Kigali and Ruhengeri, and is very mountainous, containing Mount Kabuye. Its principal town, Tare (more commonly known as Nyirangarama), serves as a rest and refreshment stop for most long distance bus services between Kigali and Gisenyi and Goma.

Economy 

Rulindo district is home to Agashya, Rwanda's leading manufacturer of passion fruit squash. Kinihira Sector is home to the Sorwathe Tea Factory.

Sectors 
Rulindo district is divided into 17 sectors (imirenge): Base, Burega, Bushoki, Buyoga, Cyinzuzi, Cyungo, Kinihira, Kisaro, Masoro, Mbogo, Murambi, Ngoma, Ntarabana, Rukozo, Rusiga, Shyorongi and Tumba.

References 
 
 Inzego.doc — Province, District and Sector information from MINALOC, the Rwanda ministry of local government.

Northern Province, Rwanda
Districts of Rwanda